Thiruvananthapuram, formerly known as Trivandrum, is the capital of the Indian state of Kerala. It is the most populous city in Kerala with a population of 957,730 as of 2011. The encompassing urban agglomeration population is around 1.68 million. Located on the west coast of India near the extreme south of the mainland, Thiruvananthapuram is a major information technology hub in Kerala and contributes 55% of the state's software exports as of 2016. Referred to by Mahatma Gandhi as the "Evergreen city of India", the city is characterised by its undulating terrain of low coastal hills.

The present regions that constitute Thiruvananthapuram were ruled by the Ays who were feudatories of the Chera dynasty. In the 12th century, it was conquered by the Kingdom of Venad. In the 18th century, the king Marthanda Varma expanded the territory, founded the princely state of Travancore, and made Thiruvananthapuram its capital. Travancore became the most dominant state in Kerala by defeating the powerful Zamorin of Kozhikode in the battle of Purakkad in 1755. Following India's independence in 1947, Thiruvananthapuram became the capital of Travancore-Cochin state and remained so until the new Indian state of Kerala was formed in 1956.

Thiruvananthapuram is a notable academic and research hub and home to the University of Kerala, APJ Abdul Kalam Technological University,  the regional headquarters of Indira Gandhi National Open University, and many other schools and colleges. Thiruvananthapuram is also home to research centers such as the National Institute for Interdisciplinary Science and Technology, Indian Space Research Organisation's Vikram Sarabhai Space Centre,  the Indian Institute of Space Science and Technology, National Centre for Earth Science Studies and a campus of the Indian Institutes of Science Education and Research. The city is home to media institutions like Toonz India Ltd and Tata Elxsi Ltd, and is also home to Chitranjali Film Studio, one of the first film studios in Malayalam Cinema, and Kinfra Film and Video Park at Kazhakoottom, which is India's first Infotainment industrial park.

Being India's largest city in the deep south, it is strategically prominent and hosts the Southern Air Command headquarters of the Indian Air Force, the Thumba Equatorial Rocket Launching Station and the upcoming Vizhinjam International Seaport. Thiruvananthapuram is a major tourist centre, known for the Padmanabhaswamy Temple, the beaches of Kovalam and Varkala, the backwaters of Poovar and Anchuthengu and its Western Ghats tracts of Ponmudi and the Agastya Mala. In 2012, Thiruvananthapuram was named the best Kerala city to live in, by a field survey conducted by The Times of India. In 2013, the city was ranked the fifteenth best city to live in India, in a survey conducted by India Today. Thiruvananthapuram was ranked the best Indian city for two consecutive years, 2015 and 2016, according to the Annual Survey of India's City-Systems (ASICS) conducted by the Janaagraha Centre for Citizenship and Democracy. The city was also selected as the best governed city in India in a survey conducted by Janaagraha Centre for citizenship and democracy in 2017.

Etymology 
The city takes its name from Malayalam word thiru-anantha-puram, meaning "The City of Lord Ananta", referring to the deity of the Sri Padmanabhaswamy Temple located in the city. Thiruvananthapuram is also known in literature, and popular reference as Ananthapuri, derived from the Sanskrit word Syanandurapuram, meaning "The City of Bliss" in Carnatic kirtanas composed by Swathi Thirunal, erstwhile Maharaja of Travancore. The city was officially referred to as Trivandrum until 1991 (Trivandrum being the anglicised name of the town), when the government decided to reinstate the city's original name Thiruvananthapuram.

History 

Thiruvananthapuram is a relatively modern region with trading traditions dating back to 1000 BCE. It is believed that the ships of King Solomon landed in a port called Ophir (now Poovar) in Thiruvananthapuram in 1036 BCE. The city was the trading post of spices, sandalwood and ivory. However, the ancient political and cultural history of the city was almost entirely independent from that of the rest of Kerala.

The Chera dynasty governed the area of Malabar Coast between Alappuzha in the south to Kasaragod in the north. This included Palakkad Gap, Coimbatore, Salem, and Kolli Hills. The region around Coimbatore was ruled by the Cheras during Sangam period between c. first and the fourth centuries CE and it served as the eastern entrance to the Palakkad Gap, the principal trade route between the Malabar Coast and Tamil Nadu. However the southern region of present-day Kerala state (The coastal belt between Thiruvananthapuram and Alappuzha) was under Ay dynasty, who was more related to the Pandya dynasty of Madurai.

The early rulers of the city were the Ays. Vizhinjam, which is now a region in the present-day Thiruvananthapuram, was the capital of the Ay dynasty. Vizhinjam was an important port city from as early as the second century BC. During the Ay dynasty's rule, Thiruvananthapuram witnessed many battles in which the Chola and Pandyan dynasties attempted to capture the port town.

After the death of king Vikramaditya Varaguna in 925 AD, the glory of the Ays departed and almost all their territories became part of the Chera dynasty. During the tenth century, the Cholas attacked and sacked Vizhinjam and surrounding regions. The port in Vizhinjam and the historic education center of Kanthalloor Sala were also destroyed by Cholas during this period. A branch of the Ay family, which had controlled the Padmanabhaswamy Temple, merged with the Kingdom of Venad in the 12th century.

Present-day Thiruvananthapuram city, district, and Kanyakumari district, were parts of the Ay dynasty during ancient and medieval ages, which was a Tamil kingdom based in the southernmost part of the Indian subcontinent. Ay kingdom had experienced attacks and conquests by Cholas and Pandyas in various periods. Later it became a part of Venad in late Middle Ages, which was eventually expanded as the powerful kingdom of Travancore in 18th century CE. The Tamil-Dravidian kind of architecture is also found in Padmanabhaswamy temple, which makes it distinct and unique from the architectural style of temples in northern and central parts of Kerala.

Modern-day Southern Kerala (The districts like Thiruvananthapuram, Kollam, Pathanamthitta, etc.) had been ruled by Tamil dynasties such as the Ay kingdom, the Pandya dynasty, and the Chola dynasty, for a long time until 16th–17th century CE. The official language of Venad, based at Kollam, was also identified as Tamil, by the natives of Venad in those times. The place names, the dialects of Malayalam spoken, and the customs that exist in the southern parts of Kerala still reveal a close relationship with Tamil heritage.  Malayalam became more prevalent with the expansion of Venad into Travancore by annexing the regions up to present-day Ernakulam district.

In the early 18th century CE, the Travancore royal family adopted some members from the royal family of Kolathunadu based at Kannur, and Parappanad based in present-day Malappuram district. Then, Marthanda Varma who inherited the Kingdom of Venad expanded the kingdom by conquering the kingdoms of Attingal, Kollam, Kayamkulam, Kottarakara, Kottayam, Changanassery, Meenachil, Poonjar and Ambalapuzha. In 1729, Marthanda Varma founded the princely state of Thiruvithamkoor and Thiruvananthapuram was made the capital in 1795 after shifting the capital from Padmanabhapuram in Kanyakumari district. Thiruvananthapuram became a prominent city in Kerala under Marthanda Varma. 

As a result of the annexation of neighbouring chiefdoms, the artists and scholars from these places migrated to Thiruvananthapuram, turning it into a cultural center. Marthanda Varma gave patronage to different temple art forms including Koothu, Padhakam, Kathakali, Thullal, and Koodiyattam. Noted artists such as Ramapurathu Warrier and Kunchan Nambiar amongst others served as his court poets. Travancore became the most dominant state in Kerala by defeating the powerful Zamorin of Kozhikode in the battle of Purakkad in 1755.

The city developed into a significant intellectual and artistic centre during this period. The city's golden age was during the mid-19th century under the reign of Maharaja Swathi Thirunal and Maharaja Ayilyam Thirunal. This era saw the establishment of the first English school (1834), the Observatory (1837), the General Hospital (1839), the Oriental Research Institute & Manuscripts Library and the University College (1873). The first mental hospital in the state was started during the same period. Sanskrit College, Ayurveda College, Law College and a second-grade college for women were started by Moolam Thirunal (1885–1924).

The early 20th century was an age of tremendous political and social changes in the city. The Sree Moolam Popular Assembly, established in 1904, was the first democratically elected legislative council in any Indian state. Despite not being under the direct control of the British Empire at any time, the city featured prominently in India's freedom struggle. The Indian National Congress had a very active presence in Thiruvananthapuram. A meeting of the Indian National Congress presided by Dr Pattabhi Sitaramaiah was held here in 1938.

The Thiruvananthapuram Municipality came into existence in 1920 as the first municipality in the Travancore region. The municipality was converted into a corporation on 30 October 1940, during the period of Chitra Thirunal Bala Rama Varma, who took over in 1931. The city witnessed multi-faceted progress during his period. The promulgation of the "Temple Entry Proclamation" (1936) was an act that underlined social emancipation. This era also saw the establishment of the University of Travancore in 1937, which later became Kerala University.

With the end of British rule in 1947, Travancore chose to join the Indian union. The first popularly elected ministry, headed by Pattom Thanu Pillai, was installed in office on 24 March 1948. In 1949, Thiruvananthapuram became the capital of Thiru-Kochi, the state formed by the integration of Travancore with its northern neighbour, the Kochi. The king of Travancore, Chitra Thirunal Bala Rama Varma, became the Rajpramukh of the Travancore-Cochin Union from 1 July 1949 until 31 October 1956. When the state of Kerala was formed on 1 November 1956, Thiruvananthapuram became its capital.

With the establishment of Thumba Equatorial Rocket Launching Station (TERLS) in 1962, Thiruvananthapuram became the cradle of India's ambitious space programme. The first Indian space rocket was developed and launched from the Vikram Sarabhai Space Centre (VSSC) in the outskirts of the city in 1963. Several establishments of the Indian Space Research Organisation (ISRO) were later established in Thiruvananthapuram.

A significant milestone in the city's recent history was the establishment of Technopark—India's first IT park—in 1995. Technopark has developed into the largest IT park in the geographical area, employing around 62,000 people in 450 companies.

Geography and climate

Geography 

The city is on the west coast of India and is bounded by the Laccadive Sea to its west and the Western Ghats to its east. The Geological Survey of India has identified Thiruvananthapuram as a moderately earthquake-prone urban centre and categorised the metropolis in the Seismic III Zone. Thiruvananthapuram lies on the shores of Karamana and Killi rivers. Vellayani, Thiruvallam and Aakulam backwaters lie in the city. The soil type in the middle part of the city is a dark brown loamy laterite soil high in phosphates. Laterisation is a result of the heavy rainfall and humid conditions. In western coastal regions of the city, sandy loam soil is found, and on hilly eastern parts of the district, rich dark brown loam of granite origin is found.

The wider Thiruvananthapuram metropolitan area comprises Thiruvananthapuram corporation, three municipalities and 27 panchayats, as of 2011. Being the largest city in India's southern tip region, it is essential for both military logistics and civil aviation in the southern part of the country. Thiruvananthapuram is the headquarters of the Southern Air Command (SAC) of the Indian Air Force.

Climate 
The city has a climate that lies on the border between a tropical savanna climate (Köppen Aw) and a tropical monsoon climate (Am). As a result, its only distinct seasons relate to rainfall rather than temperature. The humidity is high and rises to about 90% during the monsoon season. Thiruvananthapuram is the first city along the path of the south-west monsoons and gets its first showers in early June. The city also gets rain from the receding north-east monsoons which hit the city by October. The dry season sets in by December.

Demographics 

The Urban Agglomeration had a population of 1,687,406 in 2011. The sex ratio is 1,040 females for every 1,000 males, which is higher than the national average. Thiruvananthapuram's literacy rate of 93.72% exceeds the all-India average of 74%.

Malayalees form the vast majority of Thiruvananthapuram's population. Thiruvananthapuram's smaller communities are the Tamils and North Indians. According to the 2011 census, 68.5% of the population is Hindu, 16.7% Christian and 13.7% Muslims. The remainder of the community includes Jains, Jews, Sikhs, Buddhists and other religions which account for 0.06% of the population; 0.85% did not state a belief in the census.

Malayalam, the official state language, is the dominant language in Thiruvananthapuram City: English is also used, mainly by the white-collar workforce. Tamil has the most speakers after Malayalam. The city also has a few Tulu, Kannada, Konkani, Dhivehi, Telugu and Hindi speakers. As per the 2001 census, the population below the poverty line in the city was 11,667.

Thiruvananthapuram has witnessed massive immigration of workers from northern India, mainly Punjab, Haryana, and Madhya Pradesh, and Eastern India, mainly West Bengal and Bihar, and from neighbouring countries like Sri Lanka, the Maldives, Nepal and Bangladesh.

Administration 

The Corporation of Thiruvananthapuram or TMC oversees and manages the civic infrastructure of the city's 100 wards. Each ward elects a councillor to the Corporation of Thiruvananthapuram. TMC has the power to act as the local government of the city. TMC is headed by the Mayor, who is elected from among the councillors. The Mayor is responsible for the overall supervision and control of the administrative functions of the TMC. The corporation discharges its services through standing committees. The corporation secretary is an officer appointed by the government, who serves as the administrative head of the TMC and implements the council's decisions based on the resolutions adopted by the council. The functions of the Municipal Corporation are managed by seven departments—engineering, health, general administration, council, accounts and revenue. For the decentralised role of TMC, eleven Zonal Offices are created. The zonal offices are in Fort, Kadakampally, Nemom, Ulloor, Attipra, Thiruvallom, Kazhakkuttom, Sreekaryam, Kudappanakunnu, Vattiyoorkavu and Vizhinjam. The functions of the TMC include water supply, drainage and sewerage, sanitation, solid-waste management, and building regulation. The Thiruvananthapuram Development Authority is responsible for the statutory planning and development of the greater Thiruvananthapuram region.

As the seat of the Government of Kerala, Thiruvananthapuram is home to not only the offices of the local governing agencies but also the Kerala Legislative Assembly and the state secretariat, which is housed in the Kerala Government Secretariat complex. Thiruvananthapuram has two parliamentary constituencies—Attingal and Thiruvananthapuram—and elects five Members of the Legislative Assembly (MLAs) to the state legislature.

Law and order
The Thiruvananthapuram City Police is the main law-enforcement agency in the city. It is headed by a commissioner of police. The Thiruvananthapuram city police is a division of the Kerala Police, and the administrative control lies with the Kerala Home Ministry. Thiruvananthapuram city police are the largest police division in Kerala, and it consists of ten Circle offices and 21 police stations and a sanctioned strength of 3,500 police personnel. The Central Prison is the oldest prison in Kerala and the headquarters of Kerala prisons and correctional services.

Military and diplomatic establishments
The Southern Air Command of the Indian Air Force is headquartered in the city. There are two state armed police battalions and a unit of the Central Reserve Police Force (CRPF) based in Thiruvananthapuram. The CRPF has a Group Headquarters (GHQ) located at Pallipuram. In addition to this, three units of the Central Industrial Security Force (CISF) and Sector Headquarters (SHQ) of the Border Security Force (BSF) are also present. Thiruvananthapuram also houses a large army cantonment in Pangode which houses some regiments of the Indian Army.

In the city there is a Consulate of the United Arab Emirates, a Consulate of the Maldives, and Honorary Consulates of Sri Lanka, Russia and Germany.

Utility services
The Kerala Water Authority supplies the city with water that is sourced from the Karamana River; most of it is drawn from the Aruvikkara and Peppara reservoirs, and it is treated and purified at the Aruvikkara pumping stations. The Wellington Water Works, commissioned in 1933, is one of the oldest city water supply schemes in India. The sewage water is treated at Muttathara sewage-treatment plant, which handles 32 million litres per day. The city area is divided into seven blocks for the execution of the sewage system. Electricity is supplied by the Kerala State Electricity Board. Fire services are handled by the Kerala Fire And Rescue Services.

Economy 

Thiruvananthapuram's economy comprises Information Technology, education, plantations, aerospace, commerce and tourism. Thiruvananthapuram district contributes 10.31%, of the state's GDP. With an economic growth rate of 13.83%, Thiruvananthapuram is the fastest-growing district in Kerala. Thiruvananthapuram was listed as one of the top ten cities in India on Vibrancy and Consumption Index by a study conducted by global financial services firm Morgan Stanley. State- and central-government employees make up a large percentage of the city's workforce.
Thiruvananthapuram is a major aerospace research centre in India. The Vikram Sarabhai Space Centre, the most significant and leading centre of ISRO, and several space-related, state-owned ISRO centres such as Thumba Equatorial Rocket Launching Station, Liquid Propulsion Systems Centre, and ISRO Inertial Systems Unit are based in Thiruvananthapuram. The BrahMos Aerospace Trivandrum Limited is one of the leading missile integration and defence production units in India. Other enterprises include Travancore Titanium Products, Kerala Automobiles Limited, MILMA, English Indian Clays, Keltron, Trivandrum Rubber Works and HLL Lifecare Limited.

Thiruvananthapuram is a major IT and ITES hub in India. The city contributes around 55% of Kerala's total software exports. Thiruvananthapuram houses major multinational Technology companies like Oracle Corporation, Nissan, Allianz Technology, Envestnet, Tata Consultancy Services, Infosys, Toonz Animation India, UST Global, Ernst & Young, Flytxt, Navigant, Tata Elxsi, McKinsey & Company, RR Donnelly and Quest Global. Technopark is the largest information-technology park in India in terms of built-up area. It is the largest employment base campus in Kerala with 52,000 IT/ITES professionals and about 400 companies. Other IT, media and industrial campuses include Kinfra Film and Video Park, Kinfra Apparel Park, B-HUB and Chithranjali Film Complex. Several new IT, biotechnology and industrial campuses like Technocity and Bio 360 Life sciences park are under construction.

Tourism is a significant economic sector. The presence of natural attractions like beaches, backwaters, hills, and plantations and attractions like heritage, history, Ayurveda, medical tourism and knowledge centres attract many tourists. The city experienced a surge of investment in the real estate, infrastructure and retail sectors in 2016–17.

Port-related activity is low mainly due to the underdevelopment of ports. Vizhinjam International Seaport is a transhipment port under construction. Vizhinjam port's location is close to the international shipping routes and, it is just 10–12 nautical miles from the busy Persian Gulf-Malacca shipping lane. The port also has a natural depth of 18 to 20 metres which can accommodate huge container ships. The berths at Vizhinjam port are designed to cater to vessels of up to 24,000 TEU.

Tourism 

Thiruvananthapuram is a major tourist hub in India. Kovalam and Varkala are popular beach towns near the city. Other important beaches include Poovar, Shankumugham Beach, Azhimala Beach, Vizhinjam Beach and Veli Beach. The Padmanabhaswamy Temple located at the heart of the city is known as the richest place of worship in the world. Other places of interest include Agasthyamala rain forests, Neyyar Wildlife Sanctuary, Kallar, Braemore, Ponmudi hills, Poovar, Anchuthengu backwaters, Varkala Cliffs and Kappil-Edava lakes.

The city is also known for its unique style of architecture involving Kerala Architecture with British and Dravidian influences. Napier museum, Thiruvanathapuram Zoo, Padmanabha Swamy temple, Kuthira Malika palace, Kilimanoor palace and The Thiruvananthapuram Golf Club heritage building are examples of this.

The main museums include Kerala Science and Technology Museum (with its attached Priyadarsini Planetarium), Napier Museum, Kerala Soil Museum and Koyikkal Palace Museum. Agasthyamala Biosphere Reserve is listed in UNESCO's World Network of Biosphere Reserves.

Culture 

Thiruvananthapuram is known as the "Evergreen City of India" because of its green landscapes and the presence of many public parks. Thiruvananthapuram has historically been a cultural hub in South India due to the development of arts, architecture and liberal customs by the rulers of erstwhile Thiruvananthapuram. As a testimony to this, renowned artists like Maharaja Swathi Thirunal and Raja Ravi Varma hail from the city. Prominent social reformers such as Sri Narayana Guru, Chattampi Swamikal, Ayyankali, Vakkom Moulavi and C. V. Raman Pillai also are from Thiruvananthapuram.

Two of the three Malayalam triumvirate poets, Ulloor S. Parameswara Iyer and Kumaran Asan are from Thiruvananthapuram. Annual literature festivals like the Kovalam Literary Festival, are held in the city. Literary development is further aided by state institutions such as the State Central Library, one of the oldest public libraries in India, which was established in 1829, and other major libraries including the Thiruvananthapuram Corporation Central library, and the Kerala University Library. Thiruvananthapuram has been a hub of classical music since the days of Maharaja of Travancore, Swathi Thirunal. Thiruvananthapuram is known for many music festivals like the Navarathri Music Festival, one of the oldest festivals of its kind in South India, Swathi Sangeethotsavam, Soorya Music fest, Neelakanta Sivan Music Fest and many other music festivals are organised by various cultural groups. The 111-day-long Soorya Festival is the biggest art and cultural event in Kerala. The Soorya Festival features film festivals, theatre festivals, dance, music, painting and photography exhibitions.

The Malayalam film Industry was started in Thiruvananthapuram. The first Malayalam feature film, Vigathakumaran directed by J. C. Daniel was released in Thiruvananthapuram. J. C. Daniel is considered the father of Malayalam film industry. He also established the first film studio in Kerala, the Travancore National Pictures at Thiruvananthapuram in 1926. The International Film Festival of Kerala (IFFK), which is held every year in December, is one of Asia's largest film festivals in terms of viewer participation. In addition to various film festivals, the presence of the Central Board of Film Certification's regional office, many movie studios and production facilities like the Uma Studio, Chitranjali Studio, Merryland Studio, Kinfra Film and Video Park and Vismayas Max contribute to the growth of Thiruvananthapuram as a centre of cinema.

Apart from the famous Padmanabhaswamy Temple, the city's architecture is championed by the Napier Museum and Thiruvananthapuram Zoo, one of the oldest zoos in India. Other architectural landmarks include Kuthira Malika Palace, Kowdiar Palace, Attukal temple, Beemapally Mosque, Connemara Market, and the Mateer Memorial Church. Thiruvananthapuram was the main centre of Laurie Baker's architecture.

Along with the major festivals of Onam, Vishu, Deepavali, and Navaratri, Christian and Islamic festivals like Christmas, Eid ul-Fitr, Bakrid and Milad-e-sheriff, the diverse ethnic populace of the city celebrates several local festivals like Attukal Pongala, Beemapally Uroos, Vettukaad Church Festival, Padmanabhaswamy Temple Aaraattu and Lakshadeepam festival. During the Onam festival, the state government conducts several cultural events for a week in the city. The Attukal Pongala festival attracts millions of women devotees from across India and abroad. It is the largest gathering of women in the world. Germany's Goethe Zentrum, France's Alliance Française and Russia's Gorky Bhavan centres host a wide range of events and programmes throughout the year.

The general cuisine of the people is Keralite cuisine, which is generally characterised by an abundance of coconut and spices. Other South Indian cuisines, as well as Chinese and North Indian cuisines, are popular. Thiruvananthapuram has many restaurants offering Arabic, Italian, Thai and Mexican cuisines.

Transport

Public transport

The majority of bus services are conducted by government operators. There are also private operators. The city buses operated by Kerala State Road Transport Corporation (KSRTC) are an important and reliable means of public transport available in the city. The main bus stations in the city are the Central Bus Station in Thampanoor, where most of the long-distance buses ply from, and the city bus station in East Fort, where most city buses ply from. Three-wheeled, yellow and black auto-rickshaws and taxis, are other popular forms of public transport. Thiruvananthapuram Light Metro is a fully elevated metro rail – rapid transit system planned to ease the congestion in the city.

Road
Thiruvananthapuram has a well-developed road transport infrastructure. The roads in the city are maintained by the Thiruvananthapuram Roads Development Company Limited (TRDCL) and Kerala PWD. TRDCL manages the 42 km city roads which come under the Thiruvananthapuram City Roads Improvement Project (TRCIP), which is the first urban road project in India. TRCIP is a Public-private partnership project to improve and maintain the existing road network in the city to cater to the needs of rapid urbanisation. TRCIP has won the International Road Federation's Global Road Achievement Awards in 2015. TCRIP has also been selected by United Nations as a replicable Public Private Partnership model. It was one of the 12 Public-private partnership project case studies from across the world which fulfil the Sustainable Development Goals of the UN Agenda 2030.

Thiruvananthapuram is served by National Highway 66 of India's National Highways system. The city is connected to the North-South Corridor of the National Highway system at Aralvaimozhi, which is 80 km south of the city. The State Highway 1, which commonly known as the Main Central Road is an arterial highway in the city. Other major highways in the city are State Highway 2 and State Highway 45. The Mahatma Gandhi Road is the main arterial road in the city. Another important road is the Kowdiar Road, which is also known as the Royal Road, as it leads to the Kowdiar Palace.

Rail
Thiruvananthapuram is a divisional headquarters in the Southern Railway zone of the Indian Railways. Long-distance trains originate from Thiruvananthapuram Central and Kochuveli railway terminals. Kochuveli railway terminal is developed to ease congestion on the central station and it acts as a satellite station to Thiruvananthapuram Central. Thiruvananthapuram Central is the busiest railway station in Kerala. Other railway stations in the city are Thiruvananthapuram Pettah, Nemom railway station, Veli railway station and Kazhakoottam railway station. Being the southernmost municipal corporation in India, many long train services of Indian Railways originate from Thiruvananthapuram like Trivandrum Rajdhani Express, Thiruvananthapuram - Silchar Superfast Express and Kochuveli - Amritsar Weekly Express. There are plans to develop a railway terminal at Nemom railway station to reduce congestion at Thiruvananthapuram Central.

Air
Thiruvananthapuram is served by the Thiruvananthapuram International Airport, located at Chakai, only  from the city centre. The airport started operations in 1935 and is the first airport in Kerala. Being one of the gateways to the state, it has direct connectivity to all the major cities in India as well as the Middle East, Malaysia, Singapore, the Maldives and Sri Lanka. As the city is headquarters of the Southern Air Command (SAC) of the Indian Air Force, Thiruvananthapuram International Airport caters to the Indian Air Force (IAF) and the Coast Guard for their strategic operations. IAF has an exclusive apron to handle all their operations. The airport also caters to the Rajiv Gandhi Academy for Aviation Technology which carries out pilot-training activities.

Sea
Small cruise ships often dock at Vizhinjam Harbour. A cruise terminal is under construction at Vizhinjam Transshipment Terminal. Vizhinjam seaport has been designated by the government as an authorised immigration check-post for entry and exit from India for international ships and cruises.

Education

Primary and secondary education
Schools in Thiruvananthapuram are classified as aided, unaided and Government schools. The government schools are run directly by the Kerala State Education Board and follow the syllabus prescribed by the state government. The aided schools also follow the state syllabus. Malayalam and English are the primary languages of instruction; Tamil and Hindi are also used. The schools are affiliated with The State Council of Educational Research and Training (SCERT), Central Board of Secondary Education (CBSE), Indian Certificate of Secondary Education (ICSE), International General Certificate of Secondary Education (IGCSE) and National Institute of Open Schooling (NIOS). In the National Achievement Survey conducted by the National Council of Educational Research and Training (NCERT), Thiruvananthapuram is ranked as the best city in Kerala.

The notable schools in the city include St. Mary's Higher Secondary School, which is considered one of the largest schools in Asia, with the total number of students exceeding 12,000, Government Model Boys Higher Secondary School, Government Higher Secondary School for Girls, Holy Angel's Convent Trivandrum, SMV School, Trivandrum International School, Chinmaya Vidyalayas, Kendriya Vidyalaya, Loyola School, Christ Nagar School, Thiruvananthapuram, Sarvodaya Vidyalaya, Nirmala Bhavan Higher Secondary School, Arya Central School, Jyothi Nilayam School, St. Joseph's Higher Secondary School, St. Thomas Residential School, The Oxford School and VSSC Central School.

Higher education and research
Thiruvananthapuram is a major educational and research hub with various institutions in the fields of space science, information technology, physical science, biotechnology, engineering and medicine. There are three universities in Thiruvananthapuram: two state universities and one deemed university. The state universities are the University of Kerala and APJ Abdul Kalam Technological University. Indian Institute of Space Science and Technology (IIST), is a government-aided institute and deemed university. IIST is the first of its kind in the country, to offer graduate courses and research in space sciences, space technology and space applications. The city also houses two Institutes of National Importance; Sree Chitra Tirunal Institute for Medical Sciences and Technology (SCTIMST) and Indian Institute of Science Education and Research (IISER). Thiruvananthapuram is one of the regional headquarters of Indira Gandhi National Open University (IGNOU).
 
The Government Medical College, Thiruvananthapuram is the first and a premier medical school in Kerala, founded in 1951. Other notable medical schools apart from SCTIMST (which provides super-specialty courses in cardiac and neuroscience) and Regional Cancer Centre, Thiruvananthapuram (which provides PG courses in radiotherapy and pathology, and super-specialty courses) includes SUT Academy of Medical Sciences, Sree Gokulam Medical College and Government Ayurveda College.

The city houses several prominent legal education institutions. The Government Law College, formed in 1875, is one of the oldest legal education institutions in India. The Kerala Law Academy is another major legal education institution. The major Business schools include Asian School of Business, CET School of Management and Institute of Management in Kerala (IMK). There are over 23 engineering education institutions in Thiruvananthapuram. Apart from IIST and IISER, the other major engineering education institutions include College of Engineering, Trivandrum (CET), which is the first engineering college in Kerala, Government Engineering College BartonHill (GEC), Sree Chitra Thirunal College of Engineering (SCT), ER & DCI Institute of Technology, University College of Engineering, Mohandas college of Engineering and Technology and Mar Baselios College of Engineering and Technology. The University College Thiruvananthapuram established in 1866 and H.H. The Maharaja's College for Women established in 1864 are two of the oldest institutions of higher education in India.

Other prominent undergraduate and postgraduate colleges include the Government Arts College, Mahatma Gandhi College, Mar Ivanios College, Government Sanskrit College, Loyola College of Social Sciences, St. Xavier's College and All Saints College. Major fine arts colleges are Swathi Thirunal College of Music, which is the first music academy in Kerala and College of Fine Arts Trivandrum. The Lakshmibai National College of Physical Education is one of the two physical education academic institutes of the Sports Authority of India (SAI).

The premier research institutes in Thiruvananthapuram include: Indian Institute of Information Technology and Management, Kerala (IIITMK), National Institute of Speech and Hearing (NISH), Rajiv Gandhi Centre for Biotechnology, Centre for Development of Imaging Technology (C-Dit), Centre for Development Studies (CDS), Jawaharlal Nehru Tropical Botanic Garden and Research Institute, National Centre for Earth Science Studies (NCESS), Centre for Development of Advanced Computing (C-DAC) and Oriental Research Institute & Manuscripts Library.

Kerala University is ranked as the best university in Kerala according to the MHRD's National Institutional Ranking Framework (NIRF). Kerala University also ranked top in overall institution rankings in Kerala. In engineering, Indian Institute of Space Science and Technology (IIST) is ranked as the best in Kerala and College of Engineering, Trivandrum (CET) is ranked third in Kerala. College of Engineering, Trivandrum is also ranked fourth in India and first in Kerala in architecture institution rankings. The University College is listed as the best college in Kerala.

Media 

Thiruvananthapuram has numerous newspaper publications, television and radio stations. Most of the media houses in Kerala are based in Thiruvananthapuram. The first Malayalam channel, Doordarshan Malayalam began broadcasting from the city in 1981. Asianet, the first private channel in Malayalam, also started its telecasting from the city in 1993. The other Malayalam channels based in the city include Asianet News, Amrita TV, Kappa TV, Kairali TV, Kairali We, Mathrubhumi News, Kaumudy TV, JaiHind TV, News18 Kerala and People TV. All major Malayalam channels, including Asianet, Janam TV, Jeevan TV, MediaOne TV and Manorama News have production facilities or offices in the city. TV channels are accessible via cable subscription, direct-broadcast satellite services, or internet-based television. Prominent Direct-to-Home (DTH) entertainment services in Thiruvananthapuram include Sun Direct DTH, DD Direct+, Videocon d2h, Dish TV, Reliance Digital TV, Airtel digital TV and Tata Play.

Major Malayalam newspapers available are Mathrubhumi, Malayala Manorama, Kerala Kaumudi, Deshabhimani, Madhyamam, Janmabhumi, Chandrika, Thejas, Siraj Daily, Deepika and Rashtra Deepika. The English language newspapers with editions from Thiruvananthapuram are The New Indian Express, The Hindu, The Deccan Chronicle and The Times of India.

All India Radio, the national state-owned radio broadcaster, airs Medium wave and Shortwave radio stations in the city. The Vividh Bharati of All India Radio also airs an FM radio station known as Ananthapuri FM. Other FM radio channels broadcast from Thiruvananthapuram are Big FM 92.7 MHz, Club FM 94.3 MHz, Radio Mirchi 98.3 MHz, Red FM 93.5 MHz and Radio DC 90.4 MHz.

Sports 

The most popular sports in Thiruvananthapuram are cricket and football. The city hosted the first international cricket match in Kerala at the University Stadium in 1984. The city also hosted the first Twenty20 International cricket match in Kerala. The Kerala Cricket Association is headquartered in Thiruvananthapuram. Prominent cricketers from Thiruvananthapuram include Sanju Samson, Raiphi Gomez, Ryan Ninan, Aneil Nambiar, K. N. Ananthapadmanabhan, Rohan Prem, Udiramala Subramaniam, P. M. K. Mohandas, Bhaskar Pillai and Padmanabhan Prasanth. The Sports Hub, University Stadium, St Xavier's College Ground, KCA Cricket Stadium Mangalapuram, Medical College ground and Vellyani Agricultural College Ground are the main cricket grounds in the city. The Sports Hub, Trivandrum, commonly known as Greenfield Stadium is one of the largest cricket and football stadiums in India. Thiruvananthapuram hosted the 2015 SAFF Championship at the Greenfield Stadium. SBI Kerala, Titanium FC, KSEB, Kovalam FC and Travancore Royals FC are the major football clubs based in Thiruvananthapuram. Football is usually played in the Greenfield International Stadium(The Sports Hub), Chandrasekharan Nair Stadium and University Stadium. Prominent football players from Thiruvananthapuram include Jobby Justin, Vinu Jose, Thomas Sebastian, M Rajeev Kumar and Ganeshan.

The city has facilities to host most types of sports. Thiruvananthapuram was one of the main venues for the 2015 National Games of India. Athletic competitions are usually held at the University Stadium, Chandrasekharan Nair Stadium and Central Stadium. The Trivandrum Marathon is a marathon organised by the Trivandrum runners club every year. There will be two main races; a half marathon of 21 km and a full marathon of 42.19 km. A special 2 km fun run is also organised for public participation. Trivand Run is another marathon conducted every January in the city.

Jimmy George Indoor Stadium is a major indoor stadium in the state. It is used for conducting basketball, volleyball, table tennis, gymnastics, aquatics and martial arts. The stadium has the first altitude-simulated training facility in South India, known as Astra. The major sports training and coaching institutions include the Lakshmibai National College of Physical Education (LNCPE), TOSS Academy and the Tenvic Sports Coaching Academy at the Sports Hub.

Basketball tournaments are usually conducted by the schools in the city. Thiruvananthapuram hosted the 61st National Shooting Championship at the Vattiyoorkavu Shooting Range. Surfing is also a popular sport on the beaches. Many surfing and standup paddleboarding tournaments are held in the city. The surf competitions are usually held on Kovalam Beach and Varkala Beach. Paragliding is another adventure sport usually seen on Varkala Beach.

The SAI Trivandrum golf club, established in 1850, is one of the oldest golf courses in India. It is leased to the Sports Authority of India.

See also

List of people from Thiruvananthapuram

References

Further reading

External links 

Official District website 
Government of Kerala Website on Thiruvananthapuram District
List of Railway Stations in Trivandrum

 
Metropolitan cities in India
Cities and towns in Thiruvananthapuram district

Indian capital cities
Populated coastal places in India
Port cities in India
Kingdom of Travancore
Former capital cities in India
Tourism in Kerala